Saturday Night Live (also titled as Saturday Night Live! from Washington, D.C.) is a live album released in 1983 by the Washington, D.C.-based go-go band Trouble Funk.

Track listing

Side A
"A-Groove" – 1:52
"That's What We're Talking About" – 6:07
"Take It to the Bridge"– 1:15
"Grip It" – 5:51

Side B
"Double Trouble" – 0:56
"4th Gear" – 2:17
"Give Me a Quick One" – 3:43
"Sleep On It" – 9:00

Personnel
 Chester "T-Bone" Davis – lead guitar
 Tony Fisher – lead vocals, bass guitar
 Emmett Nixon – drums
 James Avery – keyboards
 Robert Reed – keyboards
 Mack Carey – percussion, congas
 Timothy David – percussion, congas
 David Rudd – saxophone
 Gerald Reed – trombone
 Taylor Reed – trombone, trumpet

References

External links
 
 Saturday Night Live at Discogs.com

1983 live albums
Trouble Funk albums
Island Records live albums